Reial Club Deportiu Espanyol de Barcelona ("Royal Spanish Sports Club of Barcelona"), commonly known as Espanyol, is a professional sports club based in Barcelona, Spain, that competes in La Liga, the top tier of the Spanish football league system.

Founded in 1900 in Barcelona, Espanyol currently play their home games at the RCDE Stadium, which holds up to 40,000 spectators. Domestically, Espanyol has won the Copa del Rey four times, most recently in 2006. In international competitions, the club reached the UEFA Cup final in 1988 and 2007. It has a long-standing rivalry with FC Barcelona.

Name

Initially known as the Sociedad Española de Football on its foundation, the name was changed to Club Español de Fútbol in 1901. In 1906, the club folded due to financial reasons and most of the players joined the X Sporting Club, which came to win the Campionat de Catalunya three times in a row before disappearing in 1908 to merge with the Spanish Jiu-Jitsu Club to be effectively relaunched as the Club Deportivo Español, and in 1910, they adopted their present-day colours. Espanyol is one of several Spanish football clubs granted patronage by the Spanish crown and thus entitled to use Real in their names and the royal crown on their badge. This right was granted to Espanyol in 1912 by Alfonso XIII and the club subsequently became known as the Real Club Deportivo Español.

Following the abdication of the same king in 1931 and the declaration of the Second Spanish Republic, due to prohibition of royal symbols, the club adopted the more Catalan/republican friendly name, Club Esportiu Espanyol. After the Spanish Civil War, the name was reverted.

The club took the Catalan spelling for its name in February 1995. The word "Deportiu" in Reial Club Deportiu Espanyol de Barcelona is a Catalanised form of the original word "Deportivo" (Castilian), despite the correct word being "Esportiu" in the Catalan language. This choice was made in order to retain the initials "RCD" in the club's name.

History

Foundation and club culture
Espanyol was founded on 28 October 1900 by Ángel Rodríguez Ruiz (1879–1959), an engineering student at the University of Barcelona. The club's original home was in the well-off district of Sarrià; Espanyol was the first club in Spain to be formed exclusively by Spanish fans of the game, with the other early clubs having links to Britain or central Europe.

The club originally played in bright yellow shirts, with the colour of the shorts being left to the individual player. A friend of the club founder owned a textile business and happened to have an abundance of yellow material left over from a job. In 1910, the club changed its name to the Club Deportivo Español and chose blue and white stripes as shirt colours and as the central colours of the club badge. Blue and white were chosen in homage to the colours appearing on the shield of the great Sicilian-Aragonese Admiral Roger de Lluria, who sailed the Mediterranean protecting the interests of the Crown of Aragon in the Middle Ages. The club was successful from the very beginning, winning the first Campionat de Catalunya in 1903 and subsequently playing in the very first Copa del Rey in 1903.

In 1906 Club Español de Football had to suspend its activities due to a lack of players, since most of them were university students who enrolled to study at universities outside Catalonia. X Sporting Club took advantage of this as most of the remaining Español players joined them, which meant a big leap in quality for the club, and as a result, the X won the Catalan championship three times in a row between 1905 and 1908, beating the likes of FC Internacional and FC Barcelona for the title. This historic side had the likes of Pedro Gibert, José Irízar and Santiago Massana. It was not until 1909 that X and Español were restructured again, when several of the former university students returned to Barcelona with the idea of refounding Club Español de Football, which they achieved on 27 December 1908, when X merged with the Spanish Jiu-Jitsu Club.

In the 1910s, they won the Campionat de Catalunya three times, in 1911–12, 1914–15 and 1917–18, winning later largely thanks to their backline led by Ricardo Zamora. They also reached the final of the Copa del Rey twice in 1911 and 1915, but lost to Athletic Bilbao on both occasions.

In 1994, Espanyol created its reserve team, Espanyol B, currently playing in the Segunda División B.

Two UEFA Cup finals (1988–2009)
Javier Clemente was hired in 1986. In his first season, he took the team to a joint-best 3rd place, qualifying for the UEFA Cup. They defeated Borussia Mönchengladbach, A.C. Milan, Inter Milan, TJ Vitkovice and Club Brugge KV to reach the final, losing on penalties to Bayer 04 Leverkusen after a 3–3 aggregate draw. Two relegations followed, but the club remained in La Liga from winning the 1993–94 Segunda División until relegated at the conclusion of the 2019-20 COVID pandemic impacted season.

President from 1989 to 1993, Juli Pardo oversaw the transformation of the club into a Sociedad Anónima Deportiva. In the wake of the accumulated debt, the club were forced to sell the Sarrià Stadium, which was eventually demolished in 1997.

Paco Flores' Espanyol won the 2000 Copa del Rey Final 2–1 against Atlético Madrid at Mestalla, a first cup win since 1940. Six years later, under Miguel Ángel Lotina, the club won again, this time 4–1 against Real Zaragoza in Madrid, with goals by Raúl Tamudo, Luis García (two) and Coro.

With this cup win, Espanyol entered the UEFA Cup. They won all their group games, before dispatching Livorno, Maccabi Haifa, Benfica, and Werder Bremen to reach the final. In the final, held on 16 May at Hampden Park in Glasgow, Espanyol fell to fellow La Liga side Sevilla, losing 3–1 in a shootout following a 2–2 draw. They became the only football team in UEFA Cup history to remain unbeaten in the tournament, yet not take home the trophy. Walter Pandiani, who would leave the club at the end of the season, was the UEFA Cup's top goalscorer that season. On 9 June 2007, Tamudo became Espanyol's highest-ever goalscorer after surpassing the 111 goals scored by Rafael Marañón, and ended the night with 113.

On 31 May 2009, Espanyol played its last match at the Estadio Olímpico de Montjuic, a 3–0 defeat of Málaga. Espanyol had played in the Estadi Olímpic after moving from their previous ground in Sarria. With the move, club talisman Raúl Tamudo had the unique distinction of having played in three different home stadiums with his club: Sarrià, Montjuïc and, beginning in the 2009–10 season, the Cornellà-El Prat.

Recent years (2009–present)

In January 2009, former Espanyol defender Mauricio Pochettino was hired as manager with the club in the relegation zone – his first senior job. He won 2–1 against rivals Barcelona at the Camp Nou in February to help keep the club up; Barcelona, under Pep Guardiola, won the treble that season.

After 12 seasons playing at the Estadi Olímpic de Montjuïc, Espanyol moved to the Estadi de Cornellá-El Prat. The new stadium was officially inaugurated on 2 August 2009 with a match between Espanyol and Liverpool; Espanyol won 3–0, with Luis García scoring the first goal at the ground, followed by a Ben Sahar double. Six days later, Espanyol captain Daniel Jarque died from a cardiac arrest aged 26 in the Florence neighbourhood of Coverciano, where the club was at the time after playing several fixtures in Italy. Since then, in the 21st minute – his former shirt number – of every Espanyol match, an ovation is made in his honour for a full minute.

After Pochettino left in 2012, the club maintained themselves in the top flight under a series of other managers. In January 2016, Chinese businessman Chen Yansheng took over the club by acquiring a 54% stake. In the 2018–19 season, Espanyol finished 7th, thus returning to the Europa League for the first time since their final run in 2006–07. However, the club suffered relegation for the first time since 1994 the following season, after a 1–0 loss at Barcelona. On 3 August 2020 the club published an official statement urging La Liga to suspend relegation; nevertheless relegation was not avoided. Espanyol won promotion back to La Liga at the first attempt on 8 May 2021 following a 0–0 draw against Zaragoza, with four matches to spare in the 42-game season.

Since 2022，RCDE has achieved a strategic cooperation with LEYU SPORTS. And LEYU became Official Asian Partner of RCDE.

Rivalries

El derbi barceloní

In the first half of the 20th century during the Miguel Primo de Rivera dictatorship (1923–1930), FC Barcelona was seen as a symbol of Catalan identity. This contrasted with RCD Espanyol which cultivated a kind of compliance with the central authority. 
 
In 1918, the municipalities of Catalonia promoted a campaign to ask the Spanish Government for a Statute of Autonomy.
FC Barcelona joined that request and the Catalan press recognized FC Barcelona as a major cultural arm of the Catalan independence movement. The city's other team, RCD Espanyol, dissociated itself from the claim due to the former's success on the European stage.

Today FC Barcelona is the club that is closer to the political powers in Catalonia. Its last presidents have linked the club with the Catalan independence movement and the holding of a referendum, even though this causes discomfort among some Catalan fans and those in the rest of Spain who feel neglected and think the team is biased against them. Although some of RCD Espanyol's directors have expressed pro-independence stances, the club stays out of politics. It is believed that most of the team's fans are against the independence of Catalonia.

On numerous occasions RCD Espanyol has complained of unfavourable and sometimes directly offensive treatment towards the club in favour of FC Barcelona by some Catalonian public media like TV3.

Despite these differences in ideology, the derbi (derby) has always been more relevant to Espanyol supporters than those of Barcelona (who hold El Clásico in higher regard instead) due to the difference in objectives.

Though it is the most played local derby in the history of La Liga, it is also the most unbalanced, with Barcelona overwhelmingly dominant. In the league table, Espanyol has only managed to finish above Barça on three occasions in almost 70 years and the only all-Catalan Copa del Rey final was won by Barça in 1957. Espanyol has the consolation of achieving the largest margin win with a 6–0 victory in 1951.

Espanyol achieved a 2–1 win against FC Barcelona during the 2008–09 season, becoming the first team to defeat Barcelona at Camp Nou in their treble-winning season.

Espanyol lost 0–1 to FC Barcelona on 8 July 2020, to be relegated to the Segunda División.

Stadium

From 1923 until 1997, Espanyol played their home games in Estadi de Sarrià in the Sarrià-Sant Gervasi district of Barcelona. In 1997, they moved to the Estadi Olímpic Lluís Companys on Montjuïc. For the beginning of the 2009–10 season, Espanyol moved into the newly constructed RCDE Stadium (also known as Estadi Cornellà-El Prat) between Cornellà de Llobregat and El Prat de Llobregat.

Competition summary

80 seasons in Primera División
4 seasons in Segunda División
8 participations in UEFA Cup / UEFA Europa League
2 participations in Inter-Cities Fairs Cup
2 participations in UEFA Intertoto Cup

Achievements
In 1928, Espanyol became a founding member of La Liga, and in 1929, the team won their first Copa del Rey. Espanyol has completed the highest number of seasons in La Liga without winning the title.
The team has qualified for the UEFA Cup/Europa League eight times (including the qualifications following their 2000 and 2006 Spanish Cup wins, which in earlier eras would instead have granted entry to the UEFA Cup Winners' Cup) and reached the final in 1988, losing to Bayer Leverkusen of then-West Germany on penalty kicks (3–2), after a two-legged final of contrasts ended level (3–0 in Barcelona, 0–3 in Leverkusen) and in 2007, losing to compatriots Sevilla, again on penalties (3–1) after a memorable match at Hampden Park, Glasgow ended 1–1 after normal time, and 2–2 after extra time.

Honours

Men's football

National
Copa del Rey
 Winners (4): 1928–29, 1940, 1999–2000, 2005–06
Runners-up (5): 1911, 1915, 1941, 1947, 1957

Segunda División
Winners (2): 1993–94, 2020–21

Supercopa de España
Runners-up: 2000, 2006

International
UEFA Cup
Runners-up: 1987–88, 2006–07

Regional
Campionat de Catalunya
Winners (11): 1903–04, 1905–06, 1906–07, 1907–08, 1911–12, 1914–15, 1917–18, 1928–29, 1932–33, 1936–37, 1939–40

Supercopa de Catalunya
Winners: 2016

Women's football

Primera División
Winners (1): 2005–06
Runners-up (3): 2006–07, 2009–10, 2010–11

Copa de la Reina
Winners (6): 1996, 1997, 2006, 2009, 2010, 2012
Runners-up (4): 1990, 2002, 2007, 2011

Players

Current squad
.

Reserve team

Out on loan

Retired numbers

Notes

Players with most appearances

Notes

Coaches

Club officials

Current technical staff

Board of directors

Presidents

Historical departments of RCD Espanyol
Until the 1990s, Espanyol had several sporting sections. In March 2017, the Association of Supporters and Shareholders of RCD Espanyol boosted a project for recovering the sporting sections of the club, but this time without any economic link with the football team. The new multi-sports club was created with the name of Seccions Deportives Espanyol (Sporting sections Espanyol).

Two months later, the association confirmed that Espanyol would start competing in the 2017–18 season, with a roller hockey team and women's volleyball teams. In the next season, the basketball section was refounded and a new section of handball would be created.

Men's basketball

Copa del Rey
Winners (1): 1941
Catalan championship
Winners (2): 1931, 1932
Runners-up (3): 1941, 1943, 1954

Women's basketball
Copa de la Reina
Winners (1): 1943
Runners-up (1): 1944

Men's rink hockey

Copa del Rey
Winners (11): 1944, 1947, 1948, 1949, 1951, 1954, 1955, 1956, 1957, 1961, 1962
Runners-up (4): 1946, 1952, 1953, 1958

Women's volleyball

Superliga
Winners (3): 1985, 1988, 1991
Copa de la Reina
Winners (5): 1984, 1985, 1986, 1990, 1992

Men's baseball
División de Honor
Winners (2): 1946, 1953

See also

 RCD Espanyol B
 RCD Espanyol cantera
 Ciutat de Barcelona Trophy

References

External links

 Official website 
 RCD Espanyol at La Liga 
 RCD Espanyol at UEFA 

 
La Liga clubs
Football clubs in Barcelona
Football clubs in Catalonia
Copa del Rey winners
Organisations based in Spain with royal patronage
Association football clubs established in 1900
1900 establishments in Spain